Armleder is a surname. Notable people with the surname include:

 John Armleder (born 1948), Swiss performance artist, painter, sculptor, and curator
 "King Armleder" Arnold von Uissigheim ( 1298–1336), persecutor of the Jews